is a Japanese film directed by Masahiro Shinoda in 2003, about the Soviet spy Richard Sorge. Shinoda intended the film, a long and lavish production that had only modest critical and commercial success, as his final feature.

Plot
The film presents the life of Richard Sorge, a German spy for the Main Intelligence Directorate (GRU) of the Soviet Army in Japan. Sorge and his contact Hotsumi Ozaki are arrested by the Tokubetsu Kōtō Keisatsu (Special Higher Police) in Tokyo, and Sorge recounts the main events in flashbacks.

Cast
Iain Glen : Richard Sorge
Masahiro Motoki : Hotsumi Ozaki
Kippei Shiina : Mitsusada Yoshikawa
Takaya Kamikawa : Tokko T
Toshiya Nagasawa : Miyagi Yotoku
Riona Hazuki : Hanako Miyake
Koyuki : Yoshiko Yamazaki
Armin Marewski  : Branko Vukelic
Yui Natsukawa : Hideko Ozaki
Takaaki Enoki : Duke Fumimaro Konoye
Hideji Otaki : Duke Kinmochi Sai-onji
Michael Christian : Josef Albert Meisinger
Shima Iwashita : Mrs. Konoe
Ulrich Mühe : Eugen Ott
Wolfgang S. Zechmayer : Max Christiansen-Clausen
Mia Yu : Agnes Smedley
Hanayagi Juraku : Emperor Hirohito
Maro Akaji : Sugiyama Hajime
Mitsuru Fukikoshi : Saionji Kenkazu
Shingo Tsurumi : Ushiba Tomohiko
Dō Haraguchi : Shigeru Honjō
Naoto Takenaka : Hideki Tojo
Tsuruoka Daijirō : Yasuhide Kurihara
Youichi Okamura : Taketora Ogata
Tatsu Kaneko : Takahashi Korekiyo
Marek Wlodarczyk : Yan Karlovich Berzin
Jurij Rosstalnyi : Semyon Uritsky
Robert Mika : Lavrentiy Beria
Peter Borchert : Joseph Stalin

Technical details
Writers: Robert Mandy & Masahiro Shinoda
Producers : Masato Hara, Masaru Koibuchi & Peter Rawley for Asmik Ace Entertainment & Manfred Durniok Filmproduktion
Music : Shin’ichirō Ikebe
Photography : Tatsuo Suzuki
Length: Japan : 182 min
Country: Japan / Germany
Language: Japanese
Colour: Colour
Sound: Dolby Digital

Honours
Best Art Direction for Hajime Oikawa at the Awards of the Japanese Academy in 2004
 Also nominated at the same awards in the following categories: 
Best Cinematography for Tatsuo Suzuki
Best Director for Masahiro Shinoda
Best Editing for Hiroshi Okuda
Best Film
Best Lighting for Hideshi Mikami
Best Music Score for Shin’ichirō Ikebe
Best Screenplay for Masahiro Shinoda and Robert Mandy
Best Sound for Tetsuo Segawa

References

External links

2003 films
2000s biographical films
2000s spy films
Japanese biographical films
World War II spy films
World War II films based on actual events
2000s Japanese films